Niobium nanowires are nanowires made of the element Niobium, which is a transition metal. Niobium nanowires in form oxide or nitride are used to detect single photons at low temperatures. The superconducting nanowire single-photon detector is an example of something made from these nano-structured materials.

References

Nanoelectronics
Niobium